Léon Hennique (4 November 1850 – 25 December 1935) was a French naturalistic novelist and playwright.

Life
Léon Hennique was born in Basse-Terre, Guadeloupe, the son of the naval infantry officer Agathon Hennique. He studied painting, but after the Franco-Prussian War of 1870 devoted himself to literature and became a naturalistic novelist and dramatist. He was a friend of Émile Zola, but broke with him over the Dreyfus Affair.

He died in Paris on 25 December 1935 and is buried at Ribemont.

His daughter was the symbolist poet Nicolette Hennique.

Works
Novels
 La Dévouée (1878)
 L'Accident de M. Hébert (1883)
 Pœuf (1887)
 Un Caractère (1889)
 Minnie Brandon (1899)

Novellas
 Deux Nouvelles (1881) [In English translation: Two Novellas: Francine Cloarec's Funeral & Benjamin Rozes; Sunny Lou Publishing, 2021.]

Plays
 L'Empereur Dassoucy (1879)
 Pierrot sceptique (with Joris-Karl Huysmans, 1881)
 Jacques Damour (1887)
 Esther Brandès (1887)
 La Mort du duc d'Enghien (1888)
 Amour (1890)
 La Menteuse (1892)
 L'Argent d'autrui (1893)
 Deux Patries (1895)
 La Petite Paroisse (with Alphonse Daudet, 1895)
 Jarnac (with Johannès Gravier, 1909)

References

Sources

External links
 

19th-century French dramatists and playwrights
20th-century French dramatists and playwrights
19th-century French novelists
20th-century French novelists
1850 births
1935 deaths
Guadeloupean people of French descent